Nizamettin Ariç (born 1956 in Ağrı, Turkey) is a contemporary Kurdish singer, composer and director. He was exposed to traditional Kurdish bard music or dengbêj at an early age, but until 1980 was professionally active as a singer of Turkish-language folksongs, including songs that he himself had translated from Kurdish to Turkish. In 1976, he began performing for Ankara Radio. In 1979, at a concert in his hometown of Ağrı, he sang a love song in Kurdish, and was arrested for spreading propaganda. Upon finding he was to be sentenced to 5–15 years, he sought political asylum in Germany and has resided in Berlin since.

Even though he was unable to perform in Turkey, as music critic Orhan Kahyaoğlu notes, Nizamettin Ariç's recordings have been influential on musicians in Turkey, especially Kardeş Türküler (who has covered several of his songs), and film/TV music arranger Aytekin Gazi Ataş. His movie A Song for Beko was one of the first films in the Kurdish language and has won 15 international awards.

Discography

Albums, Turkish language
Sources: 
Telli Sazım, Turkola, 1979
Ben Yetim, Öncü Plak, 1980
Telli Sazım / Dertli Ağrı, Aydın, 1986
Hazal Gelin, Göksöy Plakçılık, 1986/1989
Tut Elimden Düşmeyelim, Gema, precise year unknown (late 1990s)
Bekesamın/Kimsesizim, Aydın, year unknown

Albums, Kurdish language
Berivan, 1982
Çem, 1982
Dilan, 1983
Diyarbekir, 1984
Çiyayên Me, Ses Plak, 1985
Cûdî, Ses Plak, 1986
Dayê, Ses Plak, 1987
Zînê, Ses Plak, 1988
Kurdistan 1988, 1989
Ahmedo Roni, 1991
Wêneyên Xewnan (Images Dreams), Ses Plak, 1993
Bê Kesa Min / Ahmedo Ronî, Aydın Müzik, 1996
Kurdish Ballads 1, 2001
Kurdish Ballads 2, 2002
Azadi, Kalan Müzik Yapım, 2011
Dertli Cemo, Harika Müzik, year unknown
Rinda Min, Aydın, year unknown

Filmography
Sources:

As director
Klamek ji bo Beko (A Song for Beko), 1992

As composer
Dilan, dir. Erden Kiral, 1987
Komitas, dir. Don Askarian, 1989
Klamek ji bo Beko, 1992
Dugun: Die Heirat, dir. Ismet Elçi, 1993
De Jongen die niet meer praatte (The Boy Who Stopped Talking), dir. Ben Sombogaart, 1996
Hoppet (The Jump), dir. Petter Næss, 2007
5 No'lu Cezaevi: 1980-84, documentary, dir. Çayan Demirel, 2009
Ölücanlar, documentary, dir. Murat Özçelik, 2010
A Long Night, short, dir. Kamiran Betasi, 2014
Blister, short, dir. Morteza Shams, 2018

As actor
Bir Günün Hikayesi (Story of a Day), 1980 (Nizam)
Kurban Oldugum, 1982 (Halil)
Klamek ji bo Beko, 1992 (Beko)

References

1956 births
People from Ağrı
Living people
Kurdish male singers
Turkish Kurdish people
Kurdish-language singers
Kurdish composers
Kurdish film directors